The NZR 50-foot carriage of 1908 were originally constructed for the North Island Main Trunk (NIMT) passenger trains. The first were clad in Kauri, with open end platforms, however those built from 1930 were clad in steel, with enclosed vestibules. These main line cars were used by the NZR.

Introduction 
From 1930, similar cars were ordered for South Island services and for North Island provincial services, in particular, for the Rotorua Limited express. The North Island second class cars seated 42 passengers with four across, but the South Island cars seated 37 passengers with three across. Two observation cars with lounge chairs were trialed on the Rotorua service from 1930, but did not prove successful and were converted into ordinary carriages.

Further development 
In 1934 orders for carriages for mainline use in both islands, with the body width at the waist increased. The carriages had an enclosed vestibule at each end; and were divided in two by a central lavatory compartment, with a Flush toilet on one side and a "Lav" (handbasin) on the other side. Seating was three per row, with first-class passengers in single reclining chair seats, two seats on one side and one on the other side of the aisle (except that there were double seats at either end of the compartment). In second-class the initial longitudinal seats were replaced by "Addington" chairs and then "Scarrett" seats, a single seat on one side of the aisle and a double seat on the other side.
The seating for passengers was:
First class: 18 passengers and 15 passengers (total 33) in two compartments
Second class: 21 passengers and 18 passengers (total 39) in two compartments. 
Composite: 13 first class and 21 second class passengers (total 34) in two compartments.

The carriages were built at the Addington and Otahuhu Workshops. Later two first class cars were reseated as 37-seat second class cars. Some were altered to car-vans. In 1963-65 some were fitted with multiple-unit type seats for 63 passengers and used for suburban service; initially seven and later another 10, total 17. By 1974 some were used on the Rewanui Branch for miners trains. The Taieri Gorge Railway used to have four of the 50-foot carriages, but has been replacing them with 56-foot carriages.

Pre-NZR 50 foot carriages 
The Wellington and Manawatu Railway Company acquired 50-foot passenger cars Class A2 from 1903 to 1906, five first-class and thirteen second-class. The first six were from Jackson and Sharp Company of Delaware, (later the Gilbert Car Company) and later carriages were built at the WMR Thorndon Workshops.

These cars were higher the NZR loading gauge (12' 2½" (3.72m) rather than 11' 6" (3.51m)) and were required to be tested before running on Government lines; however in 1911 A 1127 lost ventilators going through a goods shed. In 1940 a ventilator on A 1106 touched the electric overhead in tunnel 10 on the NIMT and caught fire, after which ex-WMR cars were restricted to the Hutt Line.

Preserved examples

References

Citations

Bibliography

 
 
 

Railway coaches of New Zealand